Chris Jordan may refer to:

 Chris Jordan (artist) (born 1963), American environmental artist, photographer and film maker
 Chris Jordan (cricketer) (born 1988), English cricketer who plays for Sussex
 Chris Jordan (rugby league), New Zealand rugby league player

See also
Kris Jordan (1977–2023), American politician